Something Wild is the debut full-length album by Finnish melodic death metal band Children of Bodom, released in 1997 in Finland, and in 1998 worldwide. Upon release, the album was met with universal acclaim by music critics. In 2020, it was named one of the 20 best metal albums of 1997 by Metal Hammer magazine.

Track listing

Notes
The songs "Touch Like Angel of Death" and "Mass Hypnosis" both each end at 4:05. Whichever song is the final track, after 1 minute and 55 seconds of silence, a short keyboard passage is played by Alexi and Alexander in unison. This track is officially known as "Coda" and samples a melody from the theme to Miami Vice. "Touch Like Angel of Death" contains an additional 40 seconds of silence after the hidden track.
The original pressing of the album has the band's original logo before the one used in subsequent releases, and contains an eighth track titled "Bruno the Pig", consisting simply of 10 seconds of silence.

Personnel
Children of Bodom
Alexi Laiho – lead guitar, vocals, songwriting, keyboards (on Miami Vice Theme)
Alexander Kuoppala – rhythm guitar, solo on "Red Light In My Eyes Pt 1", keyboards (on Miami Vice Theme)
Henkka Seppälä – bass
Janne Wirman – keyboards (on everything except Miami Vice Theme)
Jaska Raatikainen – drums

Production
Produced by Anssi Kippo, Alexi Laiho, Jaska Raatikainen, and Children of Bodom
Recorded and mixed by Anssi Kippo
Assistant engineer – Jokke Ryhanen
Assistant mixing engineer – Pasi Karppa
Cover photo by Graham French
Band photography by Toni Harkonen
Cover artwork by Flo V. Schwarz (aka Flea Black)

Charts

References

1997 debut albums
Children of Bodom albums
Nuclear Blast albums
Spinefarm Records albums